The Story of My Life is a 2004 French romantic comedy film directed by Laurent Tirard.

Cast
Edouard Baer as Raphaël Jullian
Raphaël Fuchs as Young Raphaël
Marie-Josée Croze as Muriel
Clovis Cornillac as Kevin
Alice Taglioni as Claire 
Éric Berger as Jeff
Jean-Michel Lahmi as Max
Jean Dell as Raphaël's father
Jean-Christophe Bouvet as Raphaël's editor
Florence d'Azémar & Judith El Zein as The Yuppie

Awards
 César Award for Best Supporting Actor, 2005 for Clovis Cornillac

External links

Films directed by Laurent Tirard
2004 films
2004 romantic comedy films
French romantic comedy films
2000s French-language films
2000s French films